"100%" is the second single by American rapper, Big Pun, released posthumously from his second and final studio album Yeeeah Baby (2000).

Chart performance 
"100%" debuted at number 79 on the US Billboard Hot R&B/Hip-Hop Songs chart for the chart week dated June 17, 2000: it went on to peak at number 64 on the US Billboard Hot R&B/Hip-Hop Songs chart, spending 16 weeks on the chart in total.

Charts

References 

2000 singles
2000 songs
Big Pun songs
Music videos directed by Chris Robinson (director)
Loud Records singles
Songs written by Big Pun
Songs about Puerto Rico